Freshwater is a suburb of northern Sydney, in the state of New South Wales, Australia.

History

Aboriginal culture
The area was once fished and utilised by overlapping clans of the Garigal people to the north and the Gayamaygal to the south, and evidence of their habitation remains today in the form of the indigenous Australian art such as rock engravings, open campsites, and rock shelters.

European settlement
The first Crown grant of land in the area was to Thomas Bruin on 27 September 1815, and consisted of  directly opposite the beach. The Manly Land Company subdivided and named the property Freshwater Estate in December 1884.

In 1886 W M Gordon surveyed the subdivision named Harbord Estate. The land, divided into two sections, north and south of Curl Curl Lagoon (now named Manly Lagoon) was offered for sale in August 1886.

History of the suburb name
The Harbord Estate was named to honor the wife of New South Wales Governor Lord Carrington (gov. 1885–90). Before her marriage, Lady Carrington was the Honorable Cecilia Margaret Harbord.

For many years, the beach and the district behind it was known as Freshwater which was probably named after the stream of fresh water that ran down to the beach (now Oceanview Road). However, some time after the naming of Harbord Estate, a number of residents began to believe that the holiday image of Freshwater should be upgraded by a name change to Harbord. The change of name attracted much controversy and debate and occasionally became quite heated. When the first local district school was built in 1912, a petition was sent to the Minister of Education requesting it should be called Harbord Public School. The Minister declined and officially opened the school as Freshwater Public School. Pressure was then directed towards renaming the post office. The Postmaster-General finally accepted the views of those who wanted a residential image and Freshwater officially became Harbord on 1 September 1923.

Freshwater Bay Post Office opened on 20 April 1909 and was renamed Freshwater in 1912.

In 2003 the Harbord Chamber of Commerce submitted a request to Warringah Council to support an application to the Geographical Names Board of New South Wales to rename the suburb of Harbord to Freshwater. In public consultation 774 voted in favour and 161 voted against with the results recorded in council minutes on 8 March 2005. The suburb of Harbord was officially named Freshwater on 12 January 2008.

Council 
Along with all the suburbs of the Northern Beaches, Freshwater became part of the Northern Beaches Council on 12 May 2016. This followed the amalgamation of Manly, Pittwater and Warringah Councils.

Australian home of surfing 
In December 1914, Duke Kahanamoku, the world sprint swimming champion, was touring Australia. He selected timber from a Sydney firm to fashion a board modelled on those used in his native Hawaii, and gave a demonstration to the press of surf board riding at Freshwater Beach on Thursday 24 December. It was the second recorded time that anyone had surfed the clean waves beyond the break in Australian waters using this Hawaiian-style surfing technique. The first known surf board rider was Manly local Tommy Walker who rode a board at the 1912 Freshwater surf carnival.<Celebrate Our True Pioneer by John Morcombe Manly Daily 10-11-2011>

It was so popular that a second spur of the moment demonstration was given on a Sunday in January 1915 at Dee Why beach. Duke topped the performance by taking a local young girl, Isabel Letham on the board with him to surf the waves. Isabel went on to become a pioneer of Australian surfing. The board has been kept on display in the Freshwater Surf Life Saving Club since 1952. 
There is now a statue of Duke Paoa Kahanamoku on the headland at Freshwater. The statue was sculpted by artist Barry Donohoo, one of the last works by the artist before his death.

In 2012, Warringah Council in partnership with Freshwater Surf Life Saving Club signed a Goodwill Beach City Agreement with the coastal community of Waikiki in Honolulu, Hawaii. The ceremony came as part of an annual celebration of Duke Kahanamoku, who introduced surfing to Australia at Freshwater beach in 1915. The signing by Warringah Mayor, Michael Regan and Honolulu Mayor, Peter Carlisle was a celebration and strengthening of historic ties between the two regions.

Population
At the 2016 census, there were 8,866 residents in Freshwater. 66.3% of people were born in Australia. The most common countries of birth were England 8.9%, New Zealand 2.7%, Brazil 1.3%, United States of America 1.2% and South Africa 1.2%.  82.3% of people only spoke English at home. Other languages spoken at home included Portuguese 1.5% and Italian 1.3%. The most common responses for religion were No Religion 38.5%, Catholic 25.2% and Anglican 15.5%.

The median weekly household income of $2,268 was higher than the national median of $1,438. 51.0% of occupied private dwellings were flats or apartments, 44.3% were separate houses and 4.3% were semi-detached. The median monthly mortgage payment was $2,600.

Schools
Freshwater is home to 2 primary education schools. Harbord Public School caters for students from years K-6 was established in 1912 and St John the Baptist Catholic School.

In neighbouring suburb Curl Curl, Freshwater Senior Campus which is part of Northern Beaches Secondary College, caters for year 11 and 12 students.

Landmarks
Freshwater Beach is between Curl Curl and Queenscliff and lies on the Manly to Curl Curl Beach walk.

The Harbord Beach Hotel, which opened in 1928, is 200 metres from the beach and is known to locals as the "Harbord Hilton", due to its previous state of disrepair prior to renovations. Harbord Diggers, an RSL club, used to have bowling greens and views of the ocean, although recently was re-developed by the Mounties Group into a largely expensive over 55s seniors living complex with an RSL club underneath with limited views.

Twin/sister cities
 Waikiki Honolulu, Hawaii, United States

See also

 Freshwater Beach

References
https://www.dailytelegraph.com.au/newslocal/manly-daily/gamble-breaux-from-rhom-reveals-sydney-summers-with-a-rhos/news-story/f1afe6c92b9726f22bf9ac1132848e51

External links 
Harbord Diggers

Suburbs of Sydney
Beaches of New South Wales
Northern Beaches Council